The Game Developers Choice Awards are awards annually presented at the Game Developers Conference for outstanding game developers and games.
Introduced in 2001, the Game Developers Choice Awards were preceded by the Spotlight Awards, which were presented from 1997 to 1999. Since then, the ceremony for the Independent Games Festival is held just prior to the Choice Awards ceremony.

Winner selection process
Nominations for games are by made by International Choice Awards Network (ICAN), a group of leading game creators. Votes are then additionally made by editors of Game Developer. Any video game released in the preceding calendar year, regardless of medium, is eligible to be nominated, though upgrades, expansions, and mission packs are not eligible to be nominated.

The top nominated games are assembled into the list of nominees, typically presented in December, are then voted on by final voting body, made up of ICANs, and editors of Game Developer. In this final stage of voting, games with the highest votes in a category are the winners.

Winners for Special Awards (Lifetime Achievement, Pioneer, Ambassador) are decided by a "Special Awards Jury", which appears to consist of a variety of 5 people. This group may consider recommendations from ICAN members.

The winners are announced during the Game Developers Conference, which is typically held in March of the calendar year.

GDC related properties are owned by the UBM technology group.

Historical process

In 2007, gamasutra.com took over management of the awards from the IGDA.
An advisory board selected by the editors of gamasutra.com and Game Developer magazine oversees the selection process.

In the past, nominations are accepted from registered gamasutra.com users, confirmed to be game developers, and from the advisory board.
Once the nomination process is complete, the advisory board identifies five finalists for each regular category.

The recipients of the Lifetime Achievement, Pioneer (formerly known as First Penguin) and Maverick awards are selected by the advisory board.
For the other awards, a vote open to all those who participated in the nomination process chooses a recipient from each category's finalists.

List of winners
Note: Events held for awards are held early in the following year. Winners are listed first and highlighted in bold.

Game of the Year

The Game of the Year Award recognizes the overall best game released during the previous calendar year, as interpreted by the members of the Game Developers Conference.

Best Audio
Best Audio award recognizes the overall excellence of audio in a game, including sound effects, musical composition, sound design and orchestration.

 2000: Diablo II
 2001: Halo: Combat Evolved
 2002: Medal of Honor: Allied Assault
 2003: Call of Duty
 2004: Halo 2
 2005: Guitar Hero
 2006: Guitar Hero II
 2007: BioShock
 2008: Dead Space
 2009: Uncharted 2: Among Thieves
 2010: Red Dead Redemption
 2011: Portal 2
 2012: Journey
 2013: BioShock Infinite
 2014: Alien: Isolation
 2015: Crypt of the NecroDancer
 2016: Inside
 2017: The Legend of Zelda: Breath of the Wild
 2018: Celeste
 2019: Control
 2020: Hades
 2021: Unpacking

Best Debut
The Best Debut Award recognizes the best game from any development studio which released its first publicly available title during the calendar year. This was formerly known as the New Studio of the Year Award. In years prior to 2008, the award was awarded to the studio name, as opposed to the game title.

 2000: Valve / Minh Le / Jess Cliffe (for Counter-Strike)
 2001: Bohemia Interactive (for Operation Flashpoint: Cold War Crisis)
 2002: Retro Studios (for Metroid Prime)
 2003: Infinity Ward (for Call of Duty)
 2004: Crytek (for Far Cry)
 2005: Double Fine Productions (for Psychonauts)
 2006: Iron Lore Entertainment (for Titan Quest)
 2007: Realtime Worlds / Microsoft Game Studios (for Crackdown)
 2008: Media Molecule (for LittleBigPlanet)
 2009: Runic Games (for Torchlight)
 2010: Mojang (for Minecraft)
 2011: Supergiant Games (for Bastion)
 2012: Subset Games (for FTL: Faster Than Light)
 2013: The Fullbright Company (for Gone Home)
 2014: Stoic Studio (for The Banner Saga)
 2015: Moon Studios (for Ori and the Blind Forest)
 2016: Campo Santo (for Firewatch)
 2017: Studio MDHR (for Cuphead)
 2018: Mountains (for Florence)
 2019: ZA/UM (for Disco Elysium)
 2020: Kinetic Games for Phasmophobia
 2021: Iron Gate Studio for Valheim

Best Design
Best Design award recognizes the overall excellence of design in a game, including gameplay, mechanics, puzzles, play balancing and scenarios.

 2000: Deus Ex
 2001: Grand Theft Auto III
 2002: Battlefield 1942
 2003: Prince of Persia: The Sands of Time
 2004: Katamari Damacy
 2005: Shadow of the Colossus
 2006: Wii Sports
 2007: Portal
 2008: LittleBigPlanet
 2009: Batman: Arkham Asylum
 2010: Red Dead Redemption
 2011: Portal 2
 2012: Journey
 2013: The Last of Us
 2014: Hearthstone: Heroes of Warcraft
 2015: Rocket League
 2016: Overwatch
 2017: The Legend of Zelda: Breath of the Wild
 2018: Into the Breach
 2019: Baba Is You
 2020: Hades
 2021: It Takes Two

Best Mobile/Handheld Game
Best Mobile/Handheld Game Award recognizes the overall best game commercially released on any handheld platform.

 2007: The Legend of Zelda: Phantom Hourglass
 2008: God of War: Chains of Olympus
 2009: Scribblenauts
 2010: Cut the Rope
 2011: Superbrothers: Sword & Sworcery EP
 2012: The Room
 2013: The Legend of Zelda: A Link Between Worlds
 2014: Monument Valley
 2015: Her Story
 2016: Pokémon Go
 2017: Gorogoa
 2018: Florence
 2019: What the Golf?
 2020: Genshin Impact

Innovation Award
The Innovation Award recognizes games that demonstrate innovation and push the boundaries of games as an expressive medium. Multiple awards per year were given before 2007.

 2000: Counter-Strike; Crazy Taxi; Deus Ex; Jet Grind Radio; No One Lives Forever
 2001: Black and White; Grand Theft Auto III; ICO; Majestic; Rez
 2002: Animal Crossing; Battlefield 1942; Medal of Honor: Allied Assault; The Thing
 2003: EyeToy: Play; Viewtiful Joe; WarioWare, Inc.: Mega Microgame$!
 2004: Donkey Konga; I Love Bees; Katamari Damacy
 2005: Nintendogs; Guitar Hero
 2006: Line Rider; Ōkami; Wii Sports
 2007: Portal
 2008: LittleBigPlanet
 2009: Scribblenauts
 2010: Minecraft 
 2011: Johann Sebastian Joust  
 2012: Journey
 2013: Papers, Please
 2014: Monument Valley
 2015: Her Story
 2016: No Man's Sky
 2017: Gorogoa
 2018: Nintendo Labo
 2019: Baba Is You
 2020: Dreams
 2021: Unpacking

Best Narrative
Best Narrative award recognizes the quality of writing in a game, including story, plot construction, dialogue and branching narratives.

 2002: Tom Clancy's Splinter Cell
 2003: Star Wars: Knights of the Old Republic
 2004: Half-Life 2
 2005: Psychonauts
 2006: The Legend of Zelda: Twilight Princess
 2007: BioShock
 2008: Fallout 3
 2009: Uncharted 2: Among Thieves
 2010: Mass Effect 2
 2011: Portal 2
 2012: The Walking Dead
 2013: The Last of Us
 2014: Kentucky Route Zero: Episode 3
 2015: Her Story
 2016: Firewatch
 2017: What Remains of Edith Finch
 2018: Return of the Obra Dinn
 2019: Disco Elysium
 2020: The Last of Us Part II
 2021: Psychonauts 2

Best Technology
Best Technology award recognizes the overall excellence of technology in a game, including graphics programming, artificial intelligence, networking and physics.

 2004: Half-Life 2
 2005: Nintendogs
 2006: Gears of War
 2007: Crysis
 2008: LittleBigPlanet
 2009: Uncharted 2: Among Thieves
 2010: Red Dead Redemption
 2011: Battlefield 3
 2012: Far Cry 3
 2013: Grand Theft Auto V
 2014: Destiny
 2015: The Witcher 3: Wild Hunt
 2016: Uncharted 4: A Thief's End
 2017: Horizon Zero Dawn
 2018: Red Dead Redemption 2
 2019: Control
 2020: Microsoft Flight Simulator
 2021: Ratchet & Clank: Rift Apart

Best Visual Art
Best Visual Art award recognizes the overall excellence of visual art in a game, including animation, modeling, art direction and textures.

 2000: Jet Grind Radio
 2001: ICO
 2002: Kingdom Hearts
 2003: The Legend of Zelda: The Wind Waker
 2004: World of Warcraft
 2005: Shadow of the Colossus
 2006: Gears of War
 2007: BioShock
 2008: Prince of Persia
 2009: Uncharted 2: Among Thieves
 2010: Limbo
 2011: Uncharted 3: Drake's Deception
 2012: Journey
 2013: BioShock Infinite
 2014: Monument Valley
 2015: Ori and the Blind Forest
 2016: Inside
 2017: Cuphead
 2018: Gris
 2019: Control
 2020: Ghost of Tsushima
 2021: Ratchet & Clank: Rift Apart

Best VR/AR Game
 2016: Job Simulator: The 2050 Archives
 2017: Superhot VR
 2018: Beat Saber
 2019: Vader Immortal
 2020: Half-Life: Alyx

Special Awards Recipients

Audience Award
These awards are voted by the audience for best game of that year.

 2012: Dishonored
 2013: Kerbal Space Program
 2014: Elite: Dangerous
 2015: Life Is Strange
 2016: Battlefield 1
 2017: Nier: Automata
 2018: Beat Saber
 2019: Sky: Children of the Light
 2020: Ghost of Tsushima
 2021: Valheim

The Pioneer Award
Known as the First Penguin award until 2007, the Pioneer Award celebrates individuals who developed a breakthrough technology, game concept or gameplay design.

 2000: Chip Morningstar and Randy Farmer (creators of LucasArts's Habitat)
 2001: Hubert Chardot ("for his risk-taking work on Alone in the Dark")
 2002: David Crane, Larry Kaplan, Jim Levy, Alan Miller, Bob Whitehead (founders of Activision)
 2003: Masaya Matsuura (founder of NanaOn-Sha, pioneer of music/game integration)
 2004: Richard Bartle (co-creator of MUD, ancestor to MMOs)
 2005: Don Woods, Will Crowther (creators of the early text game Adventure)
 2006: Alexey Pajitnov (creator of Tetris)
 2007: Ralph Baer (inventor of the Magnavox Odyssey)
 2008: Alex Rigopulos and Eran Egozy (founders of Harmonix)
 2009: Gabe Newell (co-founder of Valve)
 2010: Yu Suzuki (lead of Sega AM2 development team responsible for several arcade games and the Shenmue series)
 2011: Dave Theurer (developer of Missile Command and Tempest)
 2012: Steve Russell (creator of Spacewar!)
 2013: Brandon Beck and Marc Merrill (creators of Riot Games)
 2014: David Braben (founder of Frontier Developments, co-creator of the Elite series)
 2015: Markus "Notch" Persson (creator of Minecraft)
 2016: Jordan Mechner (creator of Prince of Persia)
 2017: None (see below)
 2018: Rieko Kodama (graphic artist/director/producer for several Sega titles)
 2019: Roberta Williams (co-founder of Sierra On-line and early developer of the adventure game genre)
 2020: Tom Fulp (creator of Newgrounds and co-founder of The Behemoth)

GDC had announced their intention to award Nolan Bushnell (co-founder of Atari) the 2017 Pioneer Award. However, after several people asked the GDC to reconsider this in light of documented sexist activities in Bushnell's past in light of the current #MeToo movement, GDC opted to not award the Pioneer Award and instead "will dedicate this year's award to honor the pioneering and unheard voices of the past".

Ambassador Award
The Ambassador Award is given to individuals within or outside the industry who helped video games "advance to a better place." It replaced the IGDA Award for Community Contribution after 2008.

 2007: Jason Della Rocca (former head of International Game Developers Association)
 2008: Tommy Tallarico (video game musician and composer)
 2009: Jerry Holkins, Mike Krahulik and Robert Khoo (creators and founders of Penny Arcade)
 2010: Tim Brengle and Ian Mackenzie (Organizers of the Game Developers Conference volunteer program for 20+ years)
 2011: Kenneth Doroshow and Paul M. Smith (the lawyers which argued Brown v. Entertainment Merchants Association to the US Supreme Court supporting the video game industry)
 2012: Chris Melissinos (developer at Sun Microsystems leading gaming-related Java initiatives)
 2013: Anita Sarkeesian (creator of Feminist Frequency)
 2014: Brenda Romero (game developer, one of the leads of Romero Games)
 2015: Tracy Fullerton (game developer and professor at USC Interactive Media & Games Division)
 2016: Mark DeLoura (former editor of Game Developer and served as Senior Advisor for Digital Media for the U.S. Office of Science and Technology Policy)
 2017: Rami Ismail (co-founder of Vlambeer, assistance to indie game development)
 2018: None given
 2019: Kate Edwards (former head of the International Game Developers Association)
 2021: Steven Spohn (founder of AbleGamers)

Lifetime Achievement Award
The Lifetime Achievement Award recognizes the achievements of a developer who has impacted games and game development.

 2001: Will Wright (Sim games)
 2002: Yuji Naka (Sonic the Hedgehog)
 2003: Gunpei Yokoi (1941–1997) (Game Boy, Super Mario Land series, Metroid series)
 2004: Mark Cerny (Crash Bandicoot and Spyro the Dragon)
 2005: Eugene Jarvis (Defender and Robotron: 2084)
 2006: Richard Garriott (Ultima)
 2007: Shigeru Miyamoto (creator of Mario, Donkey Kong, The Legend of Zelda, Star Fox, F-Zero, and Pikmin)
 2008: Sid Meier (Civilization series and many different simulators)
 2009: Hideo Kojima (Metal Gear series)
 2010: John Carmack (Doom series)
 2011: Peter Molyneux (God games)
 2012: Warren Spector (Deus Ex, System Shock, Thief: The Dark Project)
 2013: Ray Muzyka and Greg Zeschuk (co-founders of BioWare)
 2014: Ken Kutaragi ("father" of the PlayStation console line)
 2015: Hironobu Sakaguchi (Final Fantasy series)
 2016: Todd Howard (Elder Scrolls, Fallout)
 2017: Tim Sweeney (founder of Epic Games)
 2018: Tim Schafer (developer for LucasArts adventure games, founder of Double Fine)
 2019: Amy Hennig (video game writer/director, notably for the Uncharted series)
 2021: Laralyn McWilliams, creative director of Free Realms and lead director of Full Spectrum Warrior
 2022: Yuji Horii, creator of the Dragon Quest series
 2023: John Romero, co-founder of id Software and Ion Storm, and co-creator of the Wolfenstein 3D, Doom, and Quake series

Retired awards
The following award categories have been retired or replaced with a different focus.

Best Downloadable Game
Best Downloadable Game Award recognizes the overall best game released on console or PC platforms specifically and solely for digital download - with an emphasis on smaller, more 'casual'-friendly titles.

 2007: flOw
 2008: World of Goo
 2009: Flower
 2011: Minecraft
 2012: Bastion
 2013: Journey
 2014: Papers, Please

Character Design
The Character Design award recognizes the overall excellence of non-licensed character design in a game, including originality, character arc and emotional depth.

 2004: Half-Life 2
 2005: Shadow of the Colossus
 2006: Ōkami

Excellence in Level Design
 2000: American McGee's Alice
 2001: ICO
 2002: Metroid Prime

Excellence in Programming
 2000: The Sims
 2001: Black and White
 2002: Neverwinter Nights
 2003: Prince of Persia: The Sands of Time

IGDA Award for Community Contribution
The IGDA Award for Community Contribution recognized developers for significant efforts "building community, sharing knowledge, speaking on behalf of developers and/or contributing to the art form of game development". The Ambassador Award replaced it after 2007.

 2000: John Carmack
 2001: Jeff Lander
 2002: Doug Church (Eidos Interactive)
 2003: Ray Muzyka and Greg Zeschuk
 2004: Sheri Graner Ray
 2005: Chris Hecker
 2006: George Sanger

Original Game Character of the Year
 2000: Seaman from Seaman
 2001: Daxter from Jak and Daxter: The Precursor Legacy
 2002: Sly Cooper from Sly Cooper and the Thievius Raccoonus
 2003: HK-47 from Star Wars: Knights of the Old Republic

Maverick Award
The Maverick Award recognizes the current achievements of a developer who exhibits independence in thought and action while experimenting with alternate/emerging forms of digital games.

 2003: Brian Fiete, Jason Kapalka, and John Vechey (PopCap Games)
 2004: Matt Adams, Ju Row Farr, and Nick Tandavanitj (Blast Theory)
 2005: Mike Dornbrook, Eran Egozy, Greg LoPiccolo, and Alex Rigopulos (Harmonix Music Systems)
 2006: Greg Costikyan

Best New Social/Online Game
 2009: FarmVille

Game Developers Choice Online Awards 
For its eight iteration in 2010, GDC Austin was rebranded as GDC Online, with a greater focus on MMOs, and social and casual games. The Game Developers Choice Online Awards were also introduced to recognize technical excellence and innovation in online games. In addition to the awards of the competitive categories, special awards were given out to pioneering online games and creators. In 2012 it was announced that GDC Online would be replaced by GDC Next in Los Angeles in 2013, and the awards were subsequently discontinued.

2010 
The 2010 awards ceremony took place on October 7, 2010. League of Legends by Riot Games led the winners with five awards from six nominations, including the publicly voted Audience Award. Richard Bartle received the Online Game Legend award for his work on the first MUD and the 2003 book Designing Virtual Worlds. The massively multiplayer online role-playing game (MMORPG) Ultima Online was inducted into the GDC Online Awards Hall of Fame for being "a specific online game that has resulted in the long-term advancement of the medium, pioneering major shifts in online game development and games as a whole."

2011 

The 2011 awards ceremony took place on October 12, 2011. All the awards from the previous year returned, and a new award for Online Innovation was introduced. Minecraft and Rift by Mojang and Trion Worlds respectively took home the most awards, with two each. Kelton Flinn and John Taylor received the special Online Game Legend award as founders of Kesmai and creators of Island of Kesmai and Air Warrior. Additionally, the MMORPG EverQuest was inducted into the GDC Online Awards Hall of Fame.

2012 

The 2011 awards ceremony took place on October 10, 2012. Star Wars: The Old Republic, developed by BioWare Austin, became the top winner at four awards, with League of Legends by Riot Games trailing slightly behind at three awards. The Online Game Legend award was given to Raph Koster, developer of previous Hall of Fame inductee Ultima Online as well as Star Wars: Galaxies. MMORPG World of Warcraft was inducted into the GDC Online Awards Hall of Fame.

Notes

References

External links
Official website

 
Video game awards
Awards established in 2001
Informa brands